Thung Wat Don is a khwaeng (subdistrict) of Sathon District, in Bangkok, Thailand. In 2020, it had a total population of 37,107 people.

References

Subdistricts of Bangkok
Sathon district